The canon law of the Catholic Church ("canon law" comes from Latin ) is "how the Church organizes and governs herself". It is the system of laws and ecclesiastical legal principles made and enforced by the hierarchical authorities of the Catholic Church to regulate its external organization and government and to order and direct the activities of Catholics toward the mission of the Church. It was the first modern Western legal system and is the oldest continuously functioning legal system in the West, while the unique traditions of Eastern Catholic canon law govern the 23 Eastern Catholic particular churches .

Positive ecclesiastical laws, based directly or indirectly upon immutable divine law or natural law, derive formal authority in the case of universal laws from promulgation by the supreme legislator—the supreme pontiff, who possesses the totality of legislative, executive, and judicial power in his person, or by the College of Bishops acting in communion with the pope. In contrast, particular laws derive formal authority from promulgation by a legislator inferior to the supreme legislator, whether an ordinary or a delegated legislator. The actual subject material of the canons is not just doctrinal or moral in nature, but all-encompassing of the human condition.

The canon law of the Catholic Church has all the ordinary elements of a mature legal system: laws, courts, lawyers, judges. The canon law of the Catholic Church is articulated in the legal code for the Latin Church as well as a code for the Eastern Catholic Churches. This canons law has principles of legal interpretation, and coercive penalties. It lacks civilly-binding force in most secular jurisdictions. Those who are versed and skilled in canon law, and professors of canon law, are called canonists (or colloquially, canon lawyers). Canon law as a sacred science is called canonistics.

The jurisprudence of canon law is the complex of legal principles and traditions within which canon law operates, while the philosophy, theology, and fundamental theory of Catholic canon law are the areas of philosophical, theological, and legal scholarship dedicated to providing a theoretical basis for canon law as a legal system and as true law.

Definitions

The term "canon law" (ius canonicum) was only regularly used from the twelfth century onwards. The term ius ecclesiasticum, by contrast, referred to the secular law, whether imperial, royal, or feudal, that dealt with relations between the state and the Catholic Church. The term corpus iuris canonici was used to denote canon law as legal system beginning in the thirteenth century.

Other terms sometimes used synonymously with ius canonicum include ius sacrum, ius ecclesiasticum, ius divinum, and ius pontificium, as well as sacri canones (sacred canons).

 is the positive law that emanates from the legislative power of the Catholic Church in its effort to govern its members in accordance with the Gospel of Jesus Christ. Fernando della Rocca used the term "ecclesiastical-positive law" in contradistinction to civil-positive law, in order to differentiate between the human legislators of church and state, all of which issue "positive law" in the normal sense.

Examples of ecclesiastical positive law are fasting during the liturgical season of Lent, and religious workers (monks, nuns, etc.) requiring permission from their superiors to publish a book.

Etymology of "canon"

The word "canon" comes from the Greek kanon, which in its original usage denoted a straight rod, was later used for a measuring stick, and eventually came to mean a rule or norm. In 325, when the first ecumenical council, Nicaea I, was held, kanon started to obtain the restricted juridical denotation of a law promulgated by a synod or ecumenical council, as well as that of an individual bishop.

Sources of canon law

The term source or fountain of canon law (fons iuris canonici) may be taken in a twofold sense: a) as the formal cause of the existence of a law, and in this sense, we speak of the fontes essendi (Latin: "sources of being") of canon law or lawgivers; b) as the material channel through which laws are handed down and made known, and in this sense the sources are styled fontes cognoscendi (Latin: "sources of knowing"), or depositaries, like sources of history.

Legal history and codification

The Catholic Church has the oldest continuously functioning legal system in the West, much later than Roman law but predating the evolution of modern European civil law traditions. What began with rules ("canons") allegedly adopted by the Apostles at the Council of Jerusalem in the first century has developed into a highly complex legal system encapsulating not just norms of the New Testament, but some elements of the Hebrew (Old Testament), Roman, Visigothic, Saxon, and Celtic legal traditions. As many as 36 collections of canon law are known to have been brought into existence before 1150.

The history of Latin canon law can be divided into four periods: the ius antiquum, the ius novum, the ius novissimum and the Codex Iuris Canonici. In relation to the Code, history can be divided into the ius vetus (all law before the 1917 Code) and the ius novum (the law of the code, or ius codicis).

The Eastern Catholic canon law of the Eastern Catholic Churches, which had developed some different disciplines and practices, underwent its own process of codification, resulting in the Codex Canonum Ecclesiarum Orientalium promulgated in 1990 by Pope John Paul II.

St. Raymond of Penyafort (1175–1275), a Spanish Dominican priest, is the patron saint of canonists, due to his important contributions to canon law in codifying the Decretales Gregorii IX. Other saintly patrons include St. Ivo of Chartres and the Jesuit St. Robert Bellarmine.

Ius antiquum

The period of canonical history known as the ius antiquum ("ancient law") extends from the foundation of the Church to the time of Gratian (mid-12th century). This period can be further divided into three periods: the time of the apostles to the death of Pope Gelasius I (A.D. 496), the end of the 5th century to the spurious collection of the 9th century, and the last up to the time of Gratian (mid-12th century).

In the Early Church, the first canons were decreed by bishops united in "Ecumenical" councils (the Emperor summoning all of the known world's bishops to attend with at least the acknowledgement of the Bishop of Rome) or "local" councils (bishops of a region or territory). Over time, these canons were supplemented with decretals of the Bishops of Rome, which were responses to doubts or problems according to the maxim, "Roma locuta est, causa finita est" ("Rome has spoken, the case is closed"). A common misconception, the Catholic Encyclopedia links this saying to St Augustine who actually said something quite different: "jam enim de hac causa duo concilia missa sunt ad sedem apostolicam; inde etiam rescripta venerunt; causa finita est" (which roughly translate to: "there are two councils, for now, this matter as brought to the Apostolic See, whence also letters are come to pass, the case was finished") in response to the heretical Pelagianism of the time.

In the first millennium of the Roman Church, the canons of various ecumenical and local councils were supplemented with decretals of the popes; these were gathered together into collections.

Ius novum

The period of canonical history known as the Ius novum ("new law") or middle period covers the time from Gratian to the Council of Trent (mid-12th century–16th century).

The spurious conciliar canons and papal decrees were gathered together into collections, both unofficial and official. In the year 1000, there was no book that had attempted to summarize the whole body of canon law, to systematize it in whole or in part. The first truly systematic collection was assembled by the Camaldolese monk Gratian in the 11th century, commonly known as the Decretum Gratiani ("Gratian's Decree") but originally called The Concordance of Discordant Canons (Concordantia Discordantium Canonum). Before Gratian there was no "jurisprudence of canon law" (system of legal interpretation and principles). Gratian is the founder of canonical jurisprudence, which merits him the title "Father of Canon Law". Gratian also had an enormous influence on the history of natural law in his transmission of the ancient doctrines of natural law to Scholasticism.

Canon law greatly increased from 1140 to 1234. After that, it slowed down, except for the laws of local councils (an area of canon law in need of scholarship), and secular laws supplemented. In 1234 Pope Gregory IX promulgated the first official collection of canons, called the Decretalia Gregorii Noni or Liber Extra. This was followed by the Liber Sextus (1298) of Boniface VIII, the Clementines (1317) of Clement V, the Extravagantes Joannis XXII and the Extravagantes Communes, all of which followed the same structure as the Liber Extra. All these collections, with the Decretum Gratiani, are together referred to as the Corpus Iuris Canonici. After the completion of the Corpus Iuris Canonici, subsequent papal legislation was published in periodic volumes called Bullaria.

In the thirteenth century, the Roman Church began to collect and organize its canon law, which after a millennium of development had become a complex and difficult system of interpretation and cross-referencing. The official collections were the Liber Extra (1234) of Pope Gregory IX, the Liber Sextus (1298) of Boniface VIII and the Clementines (1317), prepared for Clement V but published by John XXII. These were addressed to the universities by papal letters at the beginning of each collection, and these texts became textbooks for aspiring canon lawyers. In 1582 a compilation was made of the Decretum, Extra, the Sext, the Clementines, and the Extravagantes (that is, the decretals of the popes from Pope John XXII to Pope Sixtus IV).

Ius novissimum
The third canonical period, known as the ius novissimum ("newest law"), stretches from the Council of Trent to the promulgation of the 1917 Code of Canon Law which took legal effect in 1918. The start of the ius novissimum is not universally agreed upon, however. Dr. Edward N. Peters argues that the ius novissimum actually started with the Liber Extra of Gregory IX in 1234.

Ius codicis

The fourth period of canonical history is that of the present day, initiated by the promulgation of the 1917 Code of Canon Law on 27 May 1917.

Benedict XV, in his bull of promulgation, refers to the motu proprio Arduum sane, which was issued by Pius X, March 17, 1904, and gave rise to the 1917 Code. In that memorable pronouncement the late Pontiff stated the reasons which prompted him as the supreme Pastor of souls, who has the care of all the churches, to provide for a new codification of ecclesiastic laws, with a view " to put together with order and clearness all the laws of the Church thus far issued, removing all those that would be recognized as abrogated or obsolete, adapting others to the necessities of the times, and enacting new ones in conformity with the present needs."

It is sometimes referred to as the ius codicis ("law of the code") or, in comparison with all law before it, the ius novum ("new law"). From time to time, the Pontifical Council for Legislative Texts issues authentic interpretations regarding the code. The pope occasionally amends the text of the codes.

Pio-Benedictine law

By the 19th century, the body of canonical legislation included some 10,000 norms. Many of these were difficult to reconcile with one another due to changes in circumstances and practice. The situation impelled Pope Pius X to order the creation of the first Code of Canon Law, a single volume of clearly stated laws. Under the aegis of the Cardinal Pietro Gasparri, the Commission for the Codification of Canon Law was completed under Benedict XV, who promulgated the Code on 27 May 1917, effective on 29 May 1918. The work having been begun by Pius X, it was sometimes called the "Pio-Benedictine Code" but more often the 1917 Code to distinguish it from the later 1983 Code which replaced it. In its preparation, centuries of material was examined, scrutinized for authenticity by leading experts, and harmonized as much as possible with opposing canons and even other codes, from the Code of Justinian to the Napoleonic Code.

Johanno-Pauline law

In the succeeding decades, some parts of the 1917 Code were retouched, especially under Pope Pius XII. In 1959, Pope John XXIII announced, together with his intention to call the Second Vatican Council, that the 1917 Code would be completely revised. In 1963, the commission appointed to undertake the task decided to delay the project until the council had been concluded. After Vatican II closed in 1965, it became apparent that the 1917 Code would need to be revised in light of the documents and theology of Vatican II. When work finally began, almost two decades of study and discussion on drafts of the various sections were needed before Pope John Paul II could promulgate the revised edition, which came into force on 27 November 1983, having been promulgated via the apostolic constitution Sacrae Disciplinae Leges of 25 January 1983. Containing 1752 canons, it is the law currently binding on the Latin Church.

This codification is referred to as the 1983 Code of Canon Law to distinguish it from the 1917 Code. Like the preceding codification, it applies to Roman Catholics of the Latin Church.

As the currently-in-force law for the Latin Church, it constitutes a major part of the Ius vigens (Latin: "active law").

Eastern Catholic canon law 

Eastern Catholic canon law is the law of the 23 Catholic sui iuris particular churches of the Eastern Catholic tradition. Oriental canon law includes both the common tradition among all Eastern Catholic Churches, now chiefly contained in the Code of Canons of the Eastern Churches, as well as the particular law proper to each individual sui iuris particular Eastern Catholic Church. Originating with the canons of particular councils and the writings of the Eastern Church Fathers, oriental canon law developed in concert with Byzantine Roman laws, leading to the compilation of nomocanons. Oriental canon law is distinguished from Latin canon law, which developed along a separate line in the remnants of the Western Roman Empire under the direct influence of the Roman Pontiff, and is now chiefly codified in the 1983 Code of Canon Law.

Nomocanons

A nomocanon (nomokanon) is a collection of ecclesiastical law, consisting of the elements from both the civil law (nomoi) and the canon law (kanones). Collections of this kind were found only in Eastern law. The Greek Church has two principal nomocanonical collections, the "Nomocanon of John Scholasticus" of the sixth century and the "Nomocanon in 14 titles", which dates from the reign of the Byzantine Emperor Heraclius, made by fusion of the Collectio tripartita (collection of Justinian's imperial law) and "Canonic syntagma" (ecclesiastical canons). The latter was long held in esteem and passed into the Russian Church, but it was by degrees supplanted by the "Nomocanon of Photios" in 883. Photius compiled systematically the canons of the East which amount to a counterpart of Gratian in the West. His 2-part collection, a chronological collection of synodal canons and his nomocanon revision with updated civil laws, became a classical source of ancient canon law for the Greek Church.

Code of Canons of the Eastern Churches

For Eastern Catholics, two sections of Eastern Catholic canon law had already, under Pope Pius XII, been put in the form of short canons. These parts were revised as part of the application of Pope John XXIII's decision to carry out a general revision of the Church's canon law; as a result, a distinct Code for members of the Eastern Catholic Churches came into effect for the first time on 1 October 1991 (Apostolic Constitution Sacri Canones of 18 October 1990). The Code of Canons of the Eastern Churches, as it is called, differs from the Latin 1983 Code of Canon Law in matters where Eastern and Latin traditions diverge, such as terminology, discipline concerning hierarchical offices, and administration of the sacraments.

Jurisprudence of canon law

The institutions and practices of canon law paralleled the legal development of much of Europe, and consequently both modern civil law and common law bear the influences of canon law.

Much of the legislative style was adapted from that of Roman Law especially the Justinianic Corpus Iuris Civilis. After the 'fall' of the Roman Empire and up until the revival of Roman Law in the 11th century canon law served as the most important unifying force among the local systems in the Civil Law tradition. The Catholic Church developed the inquisitorial system in the Middle Ages. The canonists introduced into post-Roman Europe the concept of a higher law of ultimate justice, over and above the momentary law of the state.

The primary canonical sources of law are the 1983 Code of Canon Law, the Code of Canons of the Eastern Churches, and Pastor Bonus. Other sources include apostolic constitutions, motibus propriis, particular law, and—with the approbation of the competent legislator—custom. A law must be promulgated for it to have legal effect. A later and contrary law obrogates an earlier law.

Canonists have formulated interpretive rules of law for the magisterial (non-legislatorial) interpretation of canon laws. An authentic interpretation is an official interpretation of a law issued by the law's legislator, and has the force of law.

Philosophy, theology, and fundamental theory of Catholic canon law

Although canonical jurisprudential theory generally follows the principles of Aristotelian-Thomistic legal philosophy, Thomas Aquinas never explicitly discusses the place of canon law in his Treatise on Law However, Aquinas himself was influenced by canon law. While many canonists apply the Thomistic definition of law (lex) to canon law without objection, some authors dispute the applicability of the Thomistic definition to canon law, arguing that its application would impoverish ecclesiology and corrupt the very supernatural end of canon law.

In the decades following the Second Vatican Council, many canonists called for a more theological, rather than philosophical, conception of canon law, acknowledging the "triple relationship between theology, philosophy, and canon law". Some authors conceive of canon law as essentially theological and the discipline of canon law as a theological subdiscipline, but Msgr. Carlos José Errázuriz contends that "in a certain sense, all postconciliar canonical scholarship has shown a theological concern in the widest sense, that is, a tendency to determine more clearly the place of the juridical in the mystery of the Church."

The fundamental theory of canon law is a discipline covering the basis of canon law in the very nature of the church. Fundamental theory is a newer discipline that takes as is object "the existence and nature of what is juridical in the Church of Jesus Christ." The discipline seeks to better explain the nature of law in the church and engages in theological discussions in post-conciliar Catholicism and seeks to combat "postconciliar antijuridicism".

Canonistics, faculties, and institutes
The academic degrees in canon law are the J.C.B. (Iuris Canonici Baccalaureatus, Bachelor of Canon Law, normally taken as a graduate degree), J.C.L. (Iuris Canonici Licentiatus, Licentiate of Canon Law) and the J.C.D. (Iuris Canonici Doctor, Doctor of Canon Law), and those with a J.C.L. or higher are usually called "canonists" or "canon lawyers". Because of its specialized nature, advanced degrees in civil law or theology are normal prerequisites for the study of canon law. Canon law as a field is called canonistics.

Canon law and Church office
Under the 1983 Code of Canon Law, all seminary students are required to take courses in canon law. Some ecclesiastical officials are required to have the doctorate (JCD) or at least the licentiate (JCL) in canon law in order to fulfill their functions: judicial vicars; judges; promoters of justice; defenders of the bond; canonical advocates. In addition, vicars general and episcopal vicars are to be doctors, or at least licensed in canon law or theology. Ordinarily, bishops are to have an advanced degree (doctorate or at least licentiate) in scripture, theology, or canon law.

See also

References

Citations

Sources 

Arranged alphabetically by author:
 Aquinas, Thomas. "St. Thomas Aquinas: Summa Theologiæ, Volume 28: Law and Political Theory (Ia2æ. 90-97); Latin text. English translation, Introduction, Notes, Appendices & Glossary [by] Thomas Gilby O.P.", Blackfriars (Cambridge: Eyre and Spottiswoode Limited, 1966).
 Berman, Harold J., Law and Revolution: The Formation of the Western Legal Tradition (Cambridge, MA: Harvard University Press, 1983).
 Benedict XVI, Pope. Address of His Holiness Benedict XVI for the Inauguration of the Judicial Year of the Tribunal of the Roman Rota, Clementine Hall, 21 January 2012. https://w2.vatican.va/content/benedict-xvi/en/speeches/2012/january/documents/hf_ben-xvi_spe_20120121_rota-romana.html Accessed 29 March 2016.
 Caparros, Ernest. Exegetical Commentary on the Code of Canon Law, Volume I: Prepared under the Responsibility of the Martín de Azpilcueta Institute, Faculty of Canon Law, University of Navarre (Chicago, Illinois: Midwest Theological Forum, 2004) Edited by Ángel Marzoa, Jorge Miras and Rafael Rodríguez-Ocaña (English language edition General editor: Ernest Caparros; Review coordinator: Patrick Lagges).
 Della Rocca, Fernando, Manual of Canon Law (Milwaukee: The Bruce Publishing Company, 1959) translated by Rev. Anselm Thatcher, O.S.B.
 De Meester, A., D.J.C., Iuris Canonici et Iuris Canonico-Civilis Compendium: Nova Editio ad normam Codicis Iuris Canonici Tomus Primus (Brugis: Societatis Sancti Augustini, 1921).
 Epstein, David G., Bruce A. Markell, & Lawrence Panoroff, Cases and Materials on Contracts: Making and Doing Deals: Third Edition (St. Paul, MN: West/Thomson Reuters, 2011). 
 Errázuriz M., Carlos José. Justice in the Church: A Fundamental Theory of Canon Law (Montreal: Wilson & Lefleur Ltée, 2009) trans. Jean Gray in collaboration with Michael Dunnigan.
 Friedman, Lawrence M. American Law: An Introduction (New York: W.W. Norton & Company, 1984).
 Glendon, Mary Anne, Michael Wallace Gordon, Christopher Osakwe, Comparative Legal Traditions: Text, Materials and Cases (American Casebook Series) (St. Paul, MN: West Publishing Co., 1985).
 Howe, William Wirt. Studies in the Civil Law, and its Relation to the Law of England and America. (Boston: Little, Brown, and Company, 1896).
 Jordan, William Chester. The Penguin History of Europe: Europe in the High Middle Ages (London: Penguin Books, 2002).
 McCormick, Anne O'Hare. Vatican Journal: 1921-1954 (New York: Farrar, Straus and Cudahy, 1957).
 Mylne, Robert Scott. The Canon Law (Published by Forgotten Books 2013; originally published 1912). PIBN 1000197046.
 Orsy, Ladislas. Towards a Theological Conception of Canon Law (essay published in Jordan Hite, T.O.R., & Daniel J. Ward, O.S.B., Readings, Cases, Materials in Canon Law: A Textbook for Ministerial Students, Revised Edition (Collegeville, MN: The Liturgical Press, 1990).
 Peters, Dr. Edward N., translator, The 1917 or Pio-Benedictine Code of Canon Law: in English Translation with Extensive Scholarly Apparatus (Ignatius Press, 2001)
 Peters, Dr. Edward N., JD, JCD, Ref. Sig. Ap., CanonLaw.info
 Rommen, Heinrich A. The Natural Law: A Study in Legal and Social History and Philosophy (St Louis: B. Herder Book Co., 1947 [1959]) translated by Thomas R. Hanley, O.S.B.
 Suzzallo, Henry, Ph.D., Sc.D., LL.D., Editor in Chief, The National Encyclopedia: Volume 2 (New York, P. F. Collier & Son Corporation, 1935).
 
 Vere, Pete, & Michael Trueman, Surprised by Canon Law: 150 Questions Catholics Ask About Canon Law (Cincinnati, Ohio: St. Anthony Messenger Press, 2004).
 Wigmore, John Henry, A Panorama of the World's Legal Systems Library Edition (Washington, D.C.: Washington Law Book Company, 1936).
 Wormser, René A., The Story of the LAW and the Men Who Made It—From the Earliest Times to the Present: Revised and Updated Edition of The Law (New York: Simon and Schuster, 1962).
 Black's Law Dictionary, 5th Edition (St. Paul, MN: West Publishing Co., 1979).
 Catechism of the Catholic Church at Vatican.va
 1983 Code of Canon Law (1983 CIC) at Vatican.va. Publication details: Latin-English Edition, New English Translation; Prepared under the auspices of the Canon Law Society of America, Washington, DC 20064.

Further reading

External links

 Sacrea Disciplinae Leges 
 Norms of current canon law 
 Canon Law Wiki

Texts and translations of post-1917 canonical codifications
With referenced concordances
 Codex Iuris Canonici (1983) 
 Code of Canon Law (1983) 
 Code of Canon Law (1983) 
 Codex canonum ecclesiarum orientalium (1990) 
 Code of canons of Oriental Churchs (1990) 
 Codex Iuris Canonici (1917)  

Without concordances
 1983 Code of Canon Law 
 1983 Codex Iuris Canonici

Historical canon law texts
 The Medieval Canon Law Virtual Library
 Pseudo-Isidore: An Edition-in-Progress of the False Decretals
 Decretum Gratiani (Friedbourg edition)
 Corpus Iuris Canonici (1582)
 Code de 1917